The 2018 season was Bodø/Glimt's first season back in the Tippeligaen since their relegation at the end of the 2016 season. Bodø/Glimt finished the season in 11th position, and reached the Quarter-final of Norwegian Cup before defeat to IK Start.

Squad

Transfers

In

Out

Loans out

Released

Competitions

Eliteserien

Results summary

Results by round

Results

Table

Norwegian Cup

Squad statistics

Appearances and goals

|-
|colspan="14"|Players away from Bodø/Glimt on loan:

|-
|colspan="14"|Players who left Bodø/Glimt during the season:

|}

Goal scorers

Clean sheets

Disciplinary record

References

Bodo Glimt
FK Bodø/Glimt seasons